New Mexico State Road 75 (NM 75) is a  long state highway in Northern New Mexico, located in the Southwestern United States. NM 75 is located on the western slope of the Sangre de Cristo Mountains starting near the Rio Grande, passes through Pircuris Pueblo, and ends as a segment of the High Road to Taos near Peñasco.

Route description

NM 75 begins west near Dixon at its intersection with NM 68 .  The road then runs east through the mountain villages of Rio Lucio, Peñasco, and Vadito, before reaching its eastern terminus at intersection of NM 518 4.8 miles west of Sipapu Ski Area.   Starting at the intersection of NM 76, NM 75 is a segment of the High Road to Taos for 7 miles until the intersection with NM 518.

NM 7 is a mountainous two-lane undivided highway with few passing lanes. It is relatively straight with few switchbacks. NM 7 can be treacherous during winter conditions.

Major intersections

Gallery

See also

References

External links

 

Transportation in Rio Arriba County, New Mexico
075
Transportation in Taos County, New Mexico